The Swarm is a 2016 science fiction novel by American writers Orson Scott Card and Aaron Johnston, and the first book of the Second Formic Wars trilogy of novels in the Ender's Game series. It was released on August 2, 2016.

Plot
The first invasion of Earth was beaten back by a coalition of corporate and international military forces, and the Chinese army, but China has been devastated by the Formics' initial efforts to eradicate Earth life forms and prepare the ground for their own settlement. The Scouring of China struck fear into the other nations of the planet; that fear blossomed into drastic action when scientists determined that the single ship that wreaked such damage was merely a scout ship. Earth's government has been reorganized for defense; it now comprises a Hegemon, a planetary official responsible for keeping all the formerly warring nations in line, and a Polemarch, responsible for organizing all the military forces of the planet into the new International Fleet. But ambition and politics, greed and self-interest remain, as important members of the military continue to place their career prospects ahead of Earth's defense. It is up to Bingwen, Mazer Rackam, Victor Delgado and Lem Jukes to create a weapon that can effectively defend humanity.

Series
The book is the first of the Second Formic War trilogy by Card and Johnston. The projected titles for the second and third books are The Hive and The Queens respectively. The Hive was released on June 11, 2019.

Reception
As of September 2020 it had a rating of 4.14 out of 5 (4909 votes) on Goodreads.

See also
 List of Ender's Game characters
 List of works by Orson Scott Card

References

External links
 

2016 American novels
2016 science fiction novels
American science fiction novels
Novels by Orson Scott Card
Alien invasions in novels
Space opera novels
Ender's Game series books
American young adult novels
Fiction about near-Earth asteroids
Tor Books books